Google Cloud Datastore (Cloud Datastore) is a highly scalable, fully managed NoSQL database service offered by Google on the Google Cloud Platform. Cloud Datastore is built upon Google's Bigtable and Megastore technology. Google Cloud Datastore allows the user to create databases either in Native or Datastore Mode. Native Mode is designed for mobile and web apps, while Datastore Mode is designed for new server projects.

History 
Originally released as a feature in Google App Engine in 2008, Cloud Datastore was announced as a standalone product in 2013 during Google I/O. In 2018 at the Google Cloud Next conference, the second-generation Firestore database was opened to general availability, with a backward-compatibility mode. Google provides a path for automatically upgrading a legacy Datastore database to Firestore in Datastore mode.

GQL 

Google Cloud Datastore database has a SQL-like syntax called "GQL" (Google Query Language). GQL does not support the Join statement. Instead, one-to-many and many-to-many relationships can be accomplished using ReferenceProperty().  This shared-nothing approach allows disks to fail without the system failing. Switching from a relational database to Cloud Datastore requires a paradigm shift for developers when modeling their data.

See also 
 Azure Cosmos DB
 Amazon DynamoDB
 Oracle Cloud NoSQL DB

References

External links 
 Official website 
 Google Cloud Platform site

Cloud Datastore
Cloud storage